A special election was held in  on February 1, 1808.  In the 1806 elections, John Culpepper (F) had defeated incumbent Duncan McFarlan (DR), but McFarlan contested the election, and, on January 2, 1808, the House Committee on Elections declared the seat vacant.

Election results

Culpepper was thus returned to the House, resuming his seat on February 23, 1808.

See also
List of special elections to the United States House of Representatives

References

North Carolina 1808 07
North Carolina 1808 07
1808 07
North Carolina 07
United States House of Representatives 07
United States House of Representatives 1808 07